Fotella is a monotypic moth genus of the family Noctuidae. Its only species, Fotella notalis, is found in the US in the Big Bend region of western Texas, southern Arizona, southern California and southern Nevada. The habitat consists of dry deserts. Both the genus and species were first described by Augustus Radcliffe Grote in 1882.

The length of the forewings is 10–13 mm. There is distinct geographic variation, although this variation is not reflected in the male genitalia and rarely in the female genitalia. The male forewing is light tan brown with a few black scales. The hindwings are light brown with darker brown or gray. Adults are on wing throughout spring, summer and fall.

References

Condicinae
Monotypic moth genera
Moths described in 1882